Sumerpur is one of the 200 Legislative Assembly constituencies of Rajasthan state in India. It is in Pali district.

Members of the Legislative Assembly 
Sources:

Election results

2018

See also
List of constituencies of the Rajasthan Legislative Assembly
Pali district

References

Pali district
Assembly constituencies of Rajasthan